Simon Scherder (born 2 April 1993) is a German professional footballer who plays as a defender for SC Preußen Münster. He made his debut for the club in December 2012, as a substitute for Matt Taylor in a 4–0 win over Arminia Bielefeld in the 3. Liga.

External links
 

1993 births
Living people
German footballers
Association football defenders
SC Preußen Münster players
3. Liga players